Awake Ashta (born 5 September 1999) is an Ethiopian professional footballer who plays as a midfielder.

Biography
Ashta was born in Ethiopia to a Jewish family. He immigrated to Israel at the age of four and grew up in Jerusalem.

On 16 December 2016, he made his senior debut for Hapoel Katamon in a 6–0 loss to Maccabi Ahi Nazareth.

In December 2021, he was sent off in Hapoel Jerusalem's 1–1 draw against Hapoel Tel Aviv.

In 2022, Ashta was invited to join the Ethiopia national team.

References

External links

1999 births
Living people
Ethiopian Jews
Ethiopian emigrants to Israel
Citizens of Israel through Law of Return
Israeli footballers
Ethiopian footballers
Footballers from Jerusalem
Association football midfielders
Liga Leumit players
Israeli Premier League players
Hapoel Katamon Jerusalem F.C. players
Hapoel Jerusalem F.C. players